"Woman from Tokyo" is a song by the English rock band Deep Purple. It was first released on their 1973 album Who Do We Think We Are, and later as a single. 

The song was featured on the 2011 DVD Deep Purple with Orchestra - Live in Montreux where Deep Purple Mk 8 (Gillan - Paice - Glover - Morse - Airey) with a full symphony orchestra conducted by Stephen Bentley-Klein.

Background
Deep Purple was one of the first rock bands to perform in Japan in the early 1970s. As a tribute, the band wrote the song "Woman from Tokyo." It was one of the final songs to feature singer Ian Gillan, who departed in 1973 to pursue a solo career. The song features Japanese imagery such as "the rising sun" and "an Eastern dream," and its lyrics are about a Japanese woman whose charms fascinate the narrator. "Woman from Tokyo" grew to be one of the band's most popular songs and received heavy radio airplay. Despite this, the band did not include the song into their live-set at the time, and only began playing it when they reformed in 1984.

The admiration of Deep Purple for progressive rock is reflected in the long dreamy break that occupies the middle of the track. This break appears only on the album version and is missing from the single, which explains the sharp difference in duration between the versions.

Reception
Cash Box called the song "that super driving rocker that everyone will jump on immediately."

"Woman from Tokyo" was ranked at number 3 on Ultimate Classic Rock's list of Top 10 Roger Glover songs.

Eduardo Rivadavia of AllMusic said that "Woman from Tokyo" along with "Rat Bat Blue" were the only songs from Who Do We Think We Are that were good. It stated that the song "hinted at glories past with its signature Ritchie Blackmore riff." On the other hand, Alex Henderson of AllMusic writes of the excellence of Machine Head and Who Do We Think We Are when describing Stormbringer.  Cash Box described it as a "super charged rocker performed with great energy by the kings of electric rock."

Chart performance
"Woman from Tokyo" was a hit, as it reached No. 6 on the Dutch MegaCharts. The song peaked at 16 in Germany and 23 in Belgium. It was a modest success in the U.S., reaching no. 60 on the charts there. In Canada, the song reached no. 62 on May 12, and made a re-appearance in October, reaching no. 64 on the 20.

References

1973 songs
Deep Purple songs
Songs written by Ritchie Blackmore
Songs written by Ian Gillan
Songs written by Roger Glover
Songs written by Jon Lord
Songs written by Ian Paice
Songs about Japan
Songs about Tokyo
Songs about East Asian people
Japan in non-Japanese culture
Warner Records singles